Nijolė Sabaitė (born August 12, 1950 in Raseiniai, Lithuanian SSR) is a retired Lithuanian middle distance runner who represented internationally the USSR. She trained at VSS Nemunas in Vilnius.

Sabaitė began athletics in 1967 and was a member of the USSR National Team since 1970. She competed mainly in the 800 metres, and won an Olympic silver medal in 1972, between Germans Hildegard Falck (gold) and Gunhild Hoffmeister (bronze). She also won 800m silver at the 1973 Summer Universiade behind Lilyana Tomova from Bulgaria, studying in Vilnius Pedagogical Institute. In 1972 she was awarded the Order of the Badge of Honor.

References

External links
 
 
 
 
  
  
 

1950 births
Living people
Lithuanian female middle-distance runners
Soviet female middle-distance runners
Olympic athletes of the Soviet Union
Athletes (track and field) at the 1972 Summer Olympics
Olympic silver medalists for the Soviet Union
People from Raseiniai
Medalists at the 1972 Summer Olympics
Olympic silver medalists in athletics (track and field)
Universiade medalists in athletics (track and field)
Universiade silver medalists for the Soviet Union
Medalists at the 1973 Summer Universiade
Lithuanian University of Educational Sciences alumni